The Embarrassing Beginning is the fourth full-length album by Canadian hardcore punk band Grade.  It is a combination of two older releases with new packaging. The first eight songs are from Grade's first proper release, Grade/Believe split released on a small Canadian label called Workshop Records back in 1994. Tracks 11-13 come from the group's 1999 debut EP on Victory Records Triumph and Tragedy.

Track listing
 "Cripple"
 "Punk Rock Song"
 "Impulse"
 "Hairdie"
 "Digga Digga Song"
 "Classified"
 "Instrumental"
 "Entangled"
 "Afterthought (Demo)"
 "The Tension Between Stillness & Motion (Demo)"
 "Triumph & Tragedy (Acoustic Version)"
 "Stolen Bikes Ride Faster"
 "Panama"
 "A Year In The Past (Radio Version)"
 "Seamless (Acoustic Version)"

References

2000 albums
Victory Records albums
Grade (band) albums